In sociology, an alternative movement or alterative movement refers to a social movement that seeks limited societal change.  They target a small group of people and a specific behavior, and attempt to change the behavior of individual people in relation to that issue.

It is one of the four main types of social movements in sociology: alternative, redemptive, reformative, and revolutionary.

Mothers Against Drunk Driving (MADD) is an example of an alternative social movement because it targets one behavior—drunk driving.  Through its efforts, MADD has caused tougher drunk driving laws to be enacted, and thus changed peoples' behavior.

See also
Alter-globalization
Environmentalism
Social movement

Notes

References
Gordon Marshall. "Alternative movement." A Dictionary of Sociology. 1998. Encyclopedia.com. 17 Jan. 2009

Sociological terminology